Víctor Joaquín García Garzena (22 September 1913 – 13 August 1986) was a Chilean lawyer who was a member of the Senate of Chile.

Garzena is well remembered in his country due to a debate he had in 1973 with the then-University of Chile Student Federation president Alejandro Rojas Wainer, who was a member of the Communist Party in 1973. That debate was recorded by Patricio Guzmán's documentary film The Battle of Chile.

Early life
In 1937, Garzena graduated as a lawyer from the Pontifical Catholic University of Chile (PUC). Then, he participated in the elaboration of the Organic Code of Courts.

Political career
Garzena was one of the founders of the National Party in 1966, being its first president (1966−1968).

In 1967, he was a candidate for a seat in the Senate in the 1967 Complementary Elections for O'Higgins and Colchagua Province, but lost the election. However, in 1969, Garzena was elected senator for the same area. During the 1969−1973 period, he was a fierce opponent of Salvador Allende.

In 1983, he was one of the founders of the National Union Movement, the forerunner of the Renovación Nacional party.

References

External Links
 BCN Profile

1913 births
1986 deaths
People from Viña del Mar
Chilean people of Spanish descent
National Party (Chile, 1966) politicians
Movimiento de Unión Nacional politicians
Senators of the XLVI Legislative Period of the National Congress of Chile
Senators of the XLVII Legislative Period of the National Congress of Chile
20th-century Chilean lawyers
Pontifical Catholic University of Chile alumni